The Yaama Mosque is a mosque built in the indigenous Sudano-Sahelian architectural style, constructed in 1962 in Yaama, a village in Tahoua Region, Niger.

History 
Even after more than 60 years of French colonization that ended in 1960, the area is remarkably untouched by outside influence. Thus, when the village decided to build a Friday mosque in which everyone could gather for prayers, they chose to use traditional methods. This structure was constructed of mud bricks and later modifications included the construction of a central dome surrounded by four corner towers. Every villager made a contribution; from the landowner who donated the site, to the people who made mud bricks, carried water, gathered wood, etc.

This mosque was the recipient of the Aga Khan Award for Architecture in 1986.

Architecture 
The mosque was constructed in the indigenous Sudano-Sahelian architectural style, specifically the Tubali substyle used primarily by the Hausa people.

See also
 Lists of mosques
 List of mosques in Africa
Sudano-Sahelian architecture
Hausa people

References

External links

Yaama Mosque - Architectural Review

1962 establishments in Niger
Mosques in Niger
Mosques completed in 1962
Sudano-Sahelian architecture
Hausa-language culture